The War of 1907 was a conflict fought between El Salvador and an alliance between Honduras, Nicaragua, Salvadoran exiles, and American filibusters. The invasion of El Salvador on 11 June 1907 resulted in a quick military victory for El Salvador as invading forces withdrew by the end of the day. The war officially ended with the signing of a peace treaty on 20 December 1907 which established the Central American Court of Justice.

Background 

On 13 November 1898, a coup d'état in El Salvador led by General Tomás Regalado overthrew President General Rafael Antonio Gutiérrez, and after the coup, Regalado declared that El Salvador would no longer be a member of the Greater Republic of Central America, which it was a part of at the time. As a result of Regalado's coup, his declaration of secession from the Greater Republic, and the failure of the militaries of Honduras and Nicaragua, the other two members of the Greater Republic, to take action to forcibly prevent El Salvador's secession, the Executive Federal Council of the Greater Republic of Central America voted to dissolve the union on 29 November 1898.

From 1898 to 1903, Rafael Zaldívar, the former President of El Salvador from 1876 to 1885, attempted to convince Regalado and Mexican President Porfirio Díaz to forcibly reestablish a Central American union, like how Guatemalan President Justo Rufino Barrios attempted in 1885, but his efforts failed when Regalado's term ended in 1903. On 20 January 1902, Costa Rica, El Salvador, Honduras, and Nicaragua signed the Treaty of Peace and Compulsory Arbitration which strengthened political ties between the nations. On 2 November 1903, Guatemala, Honduras, and Nicaragua signed another treaty which outlined a similar agreement, and on 21 August 1904, El Salvador, Guatemala, Honduras, and Nicaragua signed a third treaty outlining another similar agreement. Despite the treaties, a war erupted in 1906 when Guatemala invaded El Salvador and Honduras. The war was ended with a peace treaty on 25 September 1906 when the United States intervened diplomatically. Another war erupted on 19 February 1907 when Nicaragua invaded Honduras and overthrew President Manuel Bonilla. The war ended with another diplomatic intervention by the United States and Mexico, and the nations of Central America signed the 1907 Central American Treaty of Peace and Amity on 23 April 1907.

War 

On 11 June 1907, a joint coalition of Honduran and Nicaraguan soldiers, Salvadoran exiles, and American filibusters launched a surprise invasion of Salvadoran territory in open violation of the treaty of peace and amity which was only signed two months prior. The coalition was led by General Manuel Rivas, an exiled Salvadoran military officer who was a leader of the 1894 Revolution of the 44 which brought Gutiérrez to power, and Dr. Prudencio Alfaro, an exiled Salvadoran politician who served as the Vice President of El Salvador under Gutiérrez's administration from 1895 until he was deposed in 1898. José Santos Zelaya, the President of Nicaragua, intended to help install Alfaro as President of El Salvador, deposing incumbent President General Fernando Figueroa in the process. Miguel R. Dávila allowed Honduran soldiers to join the invasion force the day prior to the invasion. During the first month of the invasion, the invading forces commenced a naval landing in Acajutla, capturing the city and seizing locomotives and cars belonging to the Salvadoran Railroad Company in the process, and the army also arrived at the city of Sonsonate. 

The day of the invasion, Figueroa gave a speech entitled "Proclamation to the Salvadoran People" in an effort to retain the loyalty and morale of the citizens of El Salvador and of the Salvadoran Army. He stated:

He also telegrammed Dr. Manuel Delgado, the Salvadoran ambassador to the United States, who was in Washington D.C. at the time:

In Acajutla, Rivas raided a bank for $20,000 in silver, which led to a personal disagreement between Rivas and Alfaro. Rivas proposed to Alfaro that they split control over the country, with Rivas ruling the east from San Salvador and Alfaro ruling the west from Sonsonate, but Alfaro objected to the proposal. Figueroa later personally led an army to Acajutla, and upon hearing the news, the soldiers under Rivas and Alfaro retreated from the city, using several boats and barges to flee to the gunboat Momotombo which landed them there.

In northern El Salvador, General Salvador Toledo commanded Salvadoran exiles and Hondurans in an invasion along the Salvadoran–Guatemalan border. General Cierra commanded 3,000 soldiers in eastern El Salvador, marching south with the intention of capturing La Unión. Figueroa declared San Salvador to be under a state of siege in order to suspend political guarantees and arrest political opponents, despite not actually being under siege. 

The war effectively ended after the first day, as the invading forces withdrew from El Salvador after no direct combat having occurred. The objective of the invasion was to capture the entire country by the end of the month.

Aftermath 

On 14 November 1907, the United States opened a peace conference in Washington D.C. to end the war, in which the five nations of Central America, Costa Rica, El Salvador, Guatemala, Honduras, and Nicaragua were invited. Honduras and Nicaragua presented a plan to reestablish a Central American union, but the plan met objections from the delegates from Costa Rica, El Salvador, and Guatemala, and the proposal eventually was dropped. On 20 December 1907, the five nations signed the treaty which established the Central American Court of Justice. The Court held its first session on 1 January 1909.

See also 

Federal Republic of Central America – the first and longest lasting union of Central American nations

References

Citations

Bibliography 

1900s in Honduras
20th century in Nicaragua
1907 in El Salvador
Conflicts in 1907
Wars involving El Salvador
Wars involving Honduras
Wars involving Nicaragua